Stowaway to Mars is a science fiction novel by British writer John Wyndham. It was first published in 1936 as Planet Plane (George Newnes Ltd, London), then serialised in The Passing Show as Stowaway to Mars and again in 1937 in Modern Wonder magazine as The Space Machine.  The novel was written under one of Wyndham's early pen names, John Beynon. It was  published by Coronet Books in 1972 as "Stowaway to Mars by John Wyndham".

Groff Conklin reviewed the first American edition, issued in 1954 as Stowaway to Mars as by John Benyon, with no mention that "Benyon" was really much better known as John Wyndham.  Conklin criticized several plot elements, and a "faintly distasteful emphasis on British nationalism", but labelled the work as "an interesting adventure story."

The title novella of the collection Sleepers of Mars was a sequel.

References

External links
 

1936 British novels
1936 science fiction novels
British science fiction novels
English novels
Novels set on Mars
Fiction set in 1981
Fiction set in 1982
Novels by John Wyndham
Space exploration novels
George Newnes Ltd books